Laurie Shong (born 2 January 1971) is a Canadian fencer and modern pentathlete. He competed in the modern pentathlon at the 1992 Summer Olympics and the épée fencing events at the 1992 and 2000 Summer Olympics.

He is married to Hungarian fencer Aida Mohamed.

References

External links
 

1971 births
Living people
Canadian male fencers
Canadian male modern pentathletes
Olympic fencers of Canada
Olympic modern pentathletes of Canada
Fencers at the 1992 Summer Olympics
Fencers at the 2000 Summer Olympics
Modern pentathletes at the 1992 Summer Olympics
Sportspeople from Vancouver